Sir John Dineley-Goodere, 5th Baronet (1729–1809) was an English eccentric.

He was the second of twin sons of Samuel Goodere, an officer in the British Royal Navy, by his wife Elizabeth Watts. Samuel Goodere was convicted and hanged for the murder of his elder brother Sir John Dineley Goodere, 2nd Baronet in 1741. The elder of the twins: Edward succeeded as the next of the Goodere baronets, but died insane and unmarried in March 1761, aged 32.

On his elder brother's death, John inherited the baronetcy, but what little remained of the family estates he soon wasted; in about 1770 he was sold his estate at Burhope, Herefordshire to Sir James Peachey (created Lord Selsey in 1794), and he lived for a time in a state bordering on destitution. At length his friendship with the Pelhams, coupled with the interest of Lord North, procured for him the pension and residence of a poor knight of Windsor. Thenceforward he seems to have used the surname of Dineley only.

He rendered himself conspicuous by the oddity of his dress, demeanour, and mode of life. He became one of the chief sights of Windsor, Berkshire. Very early each morning he locked up his house in Windsor Castle, which no one entered but himself, and went forth to purchase provisions.

Specimens of these marriage proposals, printed after the rudest fashion with the author's own hands, are given in Bernard Burke's Romance of the Aristocracy Occasionally he advertised for wives in the newspapers. He also printed some extraordinary rhymes under the title of "Methods to get Husbands. Measure in words and syllables ... With the advertised marriage offer of Sir John Dineley, Bart., of Charleton, near Worcester, extending to 375,000l., to the Reader of this Epistle, if a single lady, and has above One Hundred Guineas fortune." A copy survives in the British Museum. Burke states that though undoubtedly a monomaniac, in other matters Dineley was both sane and shrewd. Two or three times a year he visited Vauxhall and the theatres, taking care to apprise the public of his intention through the medium of the most fashionable daily papers. Wherever he went the place was invariably well attended, especially by women. Dineley persevered in his addresses to the ladies till the very close of his life, but without success. He died at Windsor in November 1809, aged about eighty. At his decease the baronetcy became extinct.

References

1729 births
1809 deaths
Baronets in the Baronetage of Great Britain
Military Knights of Windsor